Bay Street Armoury is located at 715 Bay Street in Victoria, British Columbia.

The Bay Street Drill Hall was completed in 1915.  It was created to provide training facilities for local militia units such as the Fifth Regiment of artillery, as well as to provide a home for two newly formed units, the 50th Gordon Highlanders of Canada and HQ Military District No. 11.  The Armoury was designed by architect William Ridgway Wilson, (1863-1957).

In its earlier years the armoury had more extensive use for public events as modern public facilities in Victoria had not yet been built.

It was designated a historic building in 1989. it is a two-storey drill hall with Tudor Revival elements, built during the 1896 to 1918 period when over 100 drill halls and armouries were erected across Canada; its scale reflects the dramatic increase in military participation following Canada's performance during the Second Boer War.

Units

The units stationed at the Bay Street Armoury are the 89th Royal Canadian Air Cadet Squadron, 5th (British Columbia) Field Artillery Regiment, RCA, and The Canadian Scottish Regiment (Princess Mary's).

5th (BC) Artillery Regiment Museum
The 5th (BC) Artillery Regiment Museum is located in the armoury.  The museum's artefacts reflect the history of 5th (British Columbia) Field Artillery Regiment, RCA and associated units from 1861 to the present day.  Exhibits include field artillery and cannons, uniforms, band instruments, medals, weapons, insignia, photographs and more. The museum is open on Tuesday evenings.

See also 
 List of historic places in Victoria, British Columbia

References

External links

 5th (BC) Artillery Regiment Museum
 Canadian Scottish Regiment (Princess Mary’s) and Regimental Museum

Armouries in Canada
Canadian Scottish Regiment (Princess Mary's)
Buildings and structures in Victoria, British Columbia
National Historic Sites in British Columbia
Government buildings completed in 1915
Tudor Revival architecture in Canada
Buildings and structures on the National Historic Sites of Canada register